Loewenstein may refer to:
 Lowenstein (surname), a surname
 Loewenstein's blue, a species of butterfly in the family Lycaenidae
 Loewenstein and Sons Hardware Building, a historic commercial structure located at Charleston, West Virginia.
 23298 Loewenstein, a minor planet